Baghmundi Assembly constituency is an assembly constituency in Purulia district in the Indian state of West Bengal.

Overview
As per orders of the Delimitation Commission, No. 240 Baghmundi Assembly constituency is composed of the following: Jhalda municipality; Jhalda I and Baghmundi community development blocks; Hetgugui and Sirkabad gram panchayats of Arsha community development block.

Baghmundi Assembly constituency is part of No. 35 Purulia (Lok Sabha constituency).

Members of Legislative Assembly

Election results

2021

2016

2011

.# Swing calculated on Congress and Forward Bloc vote percentages in 2006 in the now defunct Jhalda constituency.

References

Assembly constituencies of West Bengal
Politics of Purulia district